South Dakota v. Neville, 459 U.S. 553 (1983), was a United States Supreme Court case in which the Court held that prosecutors may use a suspect's refusal to submit to a blood-alcohol test as evidence of guilt and that the introduction of such evidence at trial does not violate the suspect's Fifth Amendment privilege against self incrimination.

Background
In Schmerber v. California (1966), the Supreme Court held that the extraction and analysis of blood samples does not violate the Fifth Amendment privilege against self incrimination. However, in the years following Schmerber, a split of authority emerged in state courts with regard to whether the Fifth Amendment's privilege against self incrimination prohibited the use of a suspect's refusal to submit to a blood test as evidence of guilt. South Dakota, for example, passed a statute that stated a person's refusal to submit to a blood-alcohol test “may be admissible into evidence at the trial.”

Arrest of Mason Henry Neville
On the evening of July 19, 1980, Mason Henry Neville was stopped by two Madison, South Dakota police officers after they observed Neville's car drive past a stop sign without stopping. When officers asked Neville to step out of his car, he "staggered and fell against the car to support himself." After failing several field sobriety tests, officers placed Neville under arrest. Officers asked Neville if he would submit to a blood-alcohol test, but he refused, stating “I'm too drunk, I won't pass the test.”

At trial, Neville filed a motion to suppress all evidence associated with his refusal to take a blood alcohol test on the grounds that it violated his privilege against self incrimination. The Supreme Court of South Dakota agreed that admitting evidence of Neville's refusal to take the test violated his privilege against self incrimination, and state prosecutors appealed to the United States Supreme Court.

Opinion of the Court
In a 7-2 opinion, the Supreme Court held that prosecutors could use a suspect's refusal to submit to a blood test as evidence of guilt, and the introduction of this evidence at trial does not violate the suspect's Fifth Amendment privilege against self incrimination. Writing for the Court's majority, Justice O'Connor concluded that "the state did not directly compel respondent to refuse the test." Additionally, Justice O'Connor wrote that a "simple blood-alcohol test is so safe, painless, and commonplace" that a suspect would not feel coerced to refuse the test.

Justice O'Connor also ruled that suspects who refuse to submit to a blood test are not entitled to Miranda warnings about the consequences of refusing the test because officers made it clear that a refusal to submit to a test may lead to "adverse consequences." Justice Stevens, joined by Justice Marshall wrote a dissenting opinion in which they argued that the Court in Schmerber intended to adopt a broad and liberal interpretation of the Fifth Amendment privilege against self incrimination.

See also 

List of United States Supreme Court cases
List of United States Supreme Court cases, volume 459
Fifth Amendment to the United States Constitution
Breithaupt v. Abram (1957)
Rochin v. California (1952)

References

External links
 

1983 in United States case law
United States Supreme Court cases
United States Supreme Court cases of the Burger Court